The TOMLAB Optimization Environment is a modeling platform for solving applied optimization problems in MATLAB.

Description
TOMLAB is a general purpose development and modeling environment in MATLAB for research, teaching and practical solution of optimization problems. It enables a wider range of problems to be solved in MATLAB and provides many additional solvers.

Optimization problems supported
 TOMLAB handles a wide range of problem types, among them:
 Linear programming
 Quadratic programming
 Nonlinear programming
 Mixed-integer programming
 Mixed-integer quadratic programming with or without convex quadratic constraints
 Mixed-integer nonlinear programming
 Linear and nonlinear least squares with L1, L2 and infinity norm
 Exponential data fitting
 Global optimization
 Semi-definite programming problem with bilinear matrix inequalities
 Constrained goal attainment
 Geometric programming
 Genetic programming
 Costly or expensive black-box global optimization
 Nonlinear complementarity problems

Additional features
 TOMLAB supports more areas than general optimization, for example:
 Optimal control with PROPT using Gauss and Chebyshev collocation.
 Automatic differentiation with MAD
 Interface to AMPL

Further details 
TOMLAB supports solvers like CPLEX, SNOPT, KNITRO and MIDACO. Each such solver can be called to solve one single model formulation. The supported solvers are appropriate for many problems, including linear programming, integer programming, and global optimization.

An interface to AMPL makes it possible to formulate the problem in an algebraic format. The MATLAB Compiler enables the user to build stand-alone solutions. Sister products are available for LabVIEW and Microsoft .NET.

Modeling is mainly facilitated by the TomSym class.

References

External links 
 TOMLAB
 MAD (MATLAB Automatic Differentiation)
 PROPT - MATLAB Optimal Control Software

Numerical software
Mathematical optimization software